This is a list of Recopa Sudamericana winning football managers. The Recopa Sudamericana is an annual football contest played between the previous season's Copa Libertadores and Copa Sudamericana winners. The first final was played in 1989 over two legs between Uruguayan team Nacional and Argentina's Racing; Nacional won 4–1 under the guidance of Héctor Núñez.

As of 2009, Argentinian managers have been the most successful, winning six tournaments in total, followed by Brazilians with five wins and Uruguayans with four titles. On only five occasions, the tournament was won by foreign managers—Croatian Mirko Jozić led Chilean side Colo-Colo to victory in 1992, Uruguayan Jorge Fossati led LDU Quito to win in 2009, his compatriot Luis Cubilla won the tournament with Paraguayan club Olimpia in 1991 and 2003 and Portuguese Jorge Jesus led Flamengo to the trophy in 2020 .

Jozić and Jesus are the only managers from outside South America to have won the competition. Olimpia, Colo-Colo, and LDU Quito are the only winning sides that has never won the trophy with a national manager. Marcelo Gallardo is the most successful manager with three trophies won, all with River Plate. Besides him, Luis Cubilla, Telê Santana and Alfio Basile are the only managers to have won the competition twice. Of these managers, Gallardo, Santana and Basile are the only ones to win trophies in consecutive years, thus revalidating their previous titles.

By year

By nationality
This table lists the total number of titles won by managers of each nationality.

References

External links

Managers
Recopa Sudamericana